The Progressive Labour Party was a political party in Saint Lucia.

History
The party was created by a split of the Saint Lucia Labour Party in 1981. It first contested national elections in 1982, when it finished second behind the United Workers' Party with 27.1% of the vote, but only won a single seat, taken by Jon Odlum. In the 6 April 1987 elections the party's vote share fell to 9.3% and they lost their single seat. The party received 6.0% of the vote in the early elections held later in the month and remained seatless. They did not contest any further elections.

References

Political parties in Saint Lucia
Labour parties
Political parties established in 1981
1981 establishments in Saint Lucia